In the United States, open carry refers to the practice of visibly carrying a firearm in public places, as distinguished from concealed carry, where firearms cannot be seen by the casual observer. To "carry" in this context indicates that the firearm is kept readily accessible on the person, within a holster or attached to a sling. Carrying a firearm directly in the hands, particularly in a firing position or combat stance, is known as "brandishing" and may constitute a serious crime, but that is not the mode of "carrying" discussed in this article.

The practice of open carry, where gun owners openly carry firearms while they go about their daily business, has seen an increase in the United States in recent years, and is a hotly debated topic in gun politics. This has been marked by a number of organized events intended to increase the visibility of open carry and public awareness about the practice. Proponents of open carry point to history and statistics, noting that criminals usually conceal their weapons, in contrast to the law-abiding citizens who display their weapons. As of 2022, almost all US states allow for open carry either without a permit or with a permit/license.

The gun rights community has become supportive of the practice, while gun control groups are generally opposed.

Terminology
 Open carry The act of publicly carrying a firearm on one's person in plain sight.
 Plain sight Broadly defined as not being hidden from common observation; varies somewhat from state to state. Some states specify that open carry occurs when the weapon is "partially visible," while other jurisdictions require the weapon to be "fully visible" to be considered carried openly.
 Loaded weapon Definition varies from state to state. Depending on state law, a weapon may be considered "loaded" under one of the following criteria: 
 Preemption In the context of open carry: the act of a state legislature passing laws which limit or eliminate the ability of local governments to regulate the possession or carrying of firearms.
 Prohibited persons This refers to people who are prohibited by law from carrying a firearm. Typical examples are felons, those convicted of a misdemeanor of domestic violence, those found to be addicted to alcohol or drugs, those who have been involuntarily committed to a mental institution, and those who have been dishonorably discharged from the United States Armed Forces.

Categories of law
Today in the United States, the laws vary from state to state regarding open carry of firearms. The categories are defined as follows:
 Permissive open carry states A state has passed full preemption of all firearms laws, with few exceptions. They do not prohibit open carry for all nonprohibited citizens and do not require a permit or license carry firearms openly. Open carry is lawful on foot. A permit may or may not be required to carry in a motor vehicle, depending on the state.
 Permissive open carry with local restriction states A state that generally allows open carry without a license, but additional restrictions may exist on non-license holders such as local restrictions or additional restricted locations or modes of carry. Some states exempt license holders from local restrictions while others don't.
 Licensed open carry states A state has passed full preemption of all firearms laws, with few exceptions. They permit open carry of a handgun to all nonprohibited citizens once they have been issued a permit or license. Open carry of a handgun is lawful on foot and in a motor vehicle. In practice however, some of these states that have may-issue licensing laws can be regarded as non-permissive for open carry, as issuing authorities rarely or never grant licenses to ordinary citizens.
 Anomalous open carry states Open carry is generally prohibited except either under special circumstances or in unincorporated areas of counties in which population densities are below statutorily-defined thresholds, and local authorities have enacted legislation to allow open carry with a permit in such jurisdictions (California). Thus, some local jurisdictions may permit open carry, and others may impose varying degrees of restrictions or prohibit open carry entirely.
 Non-permissive open carry states Open carry of a handgun is not lawful or is lawful only under such a limited set of circumstances that public carry is effectively prohibited. They may include when one is hunting or traveling to/from hunting locations, on property controlled by the person carrying, or for lawful self-defense. Additionally, some states with may-issue licensing laws are non-permissive when issuing authorities are highly restrictive in the issuance of licenses allowing open carry.

Jurisdictions in the United States 

In the United States, the laws concerning open carry vary by state and sometimes by municipality. The following chart lists state policies for openly carrying a loaded handgun in public.

Constitutional implications
Open carry has never been authoritatively addressed by the United States Supreme Court. The most obvious predicate for a federal right to do so would arise under the Second Amendment to the United States Constitution.

In the majority opinion in the case of District of Columbia v. Heller (2008), Justice Antonin Scalia wrote concerning the entirety of the elements of the Second Amendment; "We find that they guarantee the individual right to possess and carry weapons in case of confrontation." However, Scalia continued, "Like most rights, the Second Amendment right is not unlimited. It is not a right to keep and carry any weapon whatsoever in any manner whatsoever and for whatever purpose."

Forty five states' constitutions recognize and secure the right to keep and bear arms in some form, and none of those prohibit the open carrying of firearms. Five state constitutions provide that the state legislature may regulate the manner of keeping or bearing arms, and advocates argue that none rule out open carry specifically. Nine states' constitutions indicate that the concealed carrying of firearms may be regulated and/or prohibited by the state legislature. Open carry advocates argue that, by exclusion, open carrying of arms may not be legislatively controlled in these states. 

Section 1.7 of Kentucky's state constitution only empowers the state to enact laws prohibiting "concealed carry". Open carry without a permit is a specifically protected right in the Kentucky State Constitution and that right may not be questioned, in Holland v Commonwealth(1956) as mentioned " We observe, via obiter dicta, that although a person is granted the right to carry a weapon openly, a severe penalty is imposed for carrying it concealed. If the gun is worn outside the jacket or shirt in full view, no one may question the wearer's right so to do." Concealed Carry was decided to not be protected in the state constitution. 

The North Carolina Supreme Court ruled in State v. Kerner that requiring any form of permit, fee or license to open carry a firearm off one's own premises is unconstitutional according to article 1, Section 30 of the states constitution which says " A well regulated militia being necessary to the security of a free State, the right of the people to keep and bear arms shall not be infringed... " The court also held that concealed carry was not a right protected by the state's constitution and thus could be regulated by law.

In July 2018, a divided panel of the United States Court of Appeals for the Ninth Circuit found that Hawaii's licensing requirement for open carry violated the Second Amendment.  That ruling was vacated on February 8, 2019 and the case is scheduled to be heard en banc.

Grounds for detention 
Several courts have ruled that the mere carriage of a firearm, where it is allowable by law, is not reasonable suspicion to detain someone, however, some courts have ruled that simply being armed is grounds for seizure.

United States Supreme Court 
In Terry v. Ohio (1968), the Supreme Court ruled that police may stop a person only if they have a reasonable suspicion that the person has committed or is about to commit a crime, and may frisk the suspect for weapons if they have reasonable suspicion that the suspect is armed and dangerous. In an analog case, the Supreme Court ruled in Delaware v. Prouse (1979) that stopping automobiles for no reason other than to check the driver's license and registration violates the Fourth Amendment. In the case Florida v. J. L. (2000), the court ruled that a police officer may not legally stop and frisk anyone based solely on an anonymous tip that simply described that person's location and appearance without information as to any illegal conduct that the person might be planning.

Other federal courts 
Unless otherwise stated, the following courts ruled that carrying a firearm is not reasonable suspicion to detain someone or being armed is not a justifiable reason to frisk someone:

The Third Circuit issued its ruling in United States v. Ubiles (2000), United States v. Navedo (2012), and United States v. Lewis (2012).

The Fourth Circuit issued its ruling in United States v. Black (2013), however the decision United States v. Robinson (2017) found that a suspect stopped for a lawful reason can be frisked if the officer reasonably suspects them to be armed regardless of whether in legal possession or not.

The Sixth Circuit issued its ruling in Northrup v. City of Toledo Police Department (2015).

The Seventh Circuit issued its ruling in United States v. Leo (2015).

The Ninth Circuit issued its ruling in United States v. Brown (2019), however the decision United States v. Orman (2007) held that a police officer seizing a firearm for safety did not violate the Fourth Amendment.

The Tenth Circuit issued its ruling in United States v. King (1993) and United States v. Roch (1993), however the decision United States v. Rodriguez (2013) found that the presence of a handgun in a waistband is grounds for reasonable suspicion of unlawfully carrying a deadly weapon thus justifying a stop and frisk.

The District Court of New Mexico issued its ruling in St. John v. McColley (2009).

State courts 
Unless otherwise stated, the following courts ruled that carrying a firearm is not reasonable suspicion to detain someone or being armed is not a justifiable reason to frisk someone:

The Arizona Supreme Court issued its ruling in State v. Serna (2014).

The Florida Fourth District Court of Appeal issued its ruling in Regalado v. State (2009).

The Idaho Supreme Court issued its ruling in State v. Bishop (2009).

The Illinois Supreme Court issued its ruling in People v. Granados (2002) however the decision People v. Colyar (2013) found that the presence of a bullet justified officers searching for weapons for officer safety.

The Indiana Supreme Court issued its ruling in Pinner v. Indiana (2017).

The Kentucky Court of Appeals issued its ruling in Pulley v. Commonwealth (2016).

The New Jersey Superior Court, Appellate Division issued its ruling in State v. Goree (2000).

The New Mexico Supreme Court issued its ruling in State v. Vandenberg and Swanson (2003) holding that frisking for weapons was reasonable.

The Pennsylvania Supreme Court issued its ruling in Commonwealth v. Hawkins (1997) and Commonwealth v. Hicks (2019).

The Tennessee Supreme Court issued its ruling in State v. Williamson (2012).

Demonstrations and events

 May 2, 1967 openly armed members of the Black Panther Party marched on the California state capitol in opposition to the then-proposed Mulford Act prohibiting the public carrying of loaded firearms. After the march in the state capitol building, the law was quickly enacted.
 On June 16, 2000, the New Black Panther Party along with the National Black United Front and the New Black Muslim Movement protested against the death sentencing conviction of Gary Graham, by openly carrying shotguns and rifles at the Texas Republican National convention in Houston, Texas.
 In 2003, gun rights supporters in Ohio used a succession of open carry "Defense Walks" attempting to persuade the governor to sign concealed carry legislation into law.
 The legality of open carry of certain firearms in Virginia was reaffirmed after several 2004 incidents in which citizens openly carrying firearms were confronted by local law enforcement. The Virginia law prohibits the open carry, in certain localities, of any semiautomatic weapon holding more than 20 rounds or a shotgun that holds more than seven rounds, without a concealed carry permit.
 In 2008, Clachelle and Kevin Jensen, of Utah, were photographed together openly carrying handguns in the Salt Lake City International Airport near a "no weapons" sign. The photo led to an article in The Salt Lake Tribune about the airport's preempted "no weapons" signs. After a few weeks, the city removed the signs.
 In 2008, Zachary Mead was detained in Richmond County, Georgia by law enforcement for openly carrying a firearm. The weapon was seized. The organization GeorgiaCarry.org filed a lawsuit on behalf of Mead. The court declared that the seizure was a violation of the Fourth Amendment to the United States Constitution, awarded court costs and attorney fees to Mead, and dismissed the remaining charges with prejudice.
 In 2008, Brad Krause of West Allis, Wisconsin was arrested by police for alleged disorderly conduct while openly carrying a firearm while planting a tree on his property. A court later acquitted him of the disorderly conduct charge, observing in the process that in Wisconsin there is no law dealing with the issue of unconcealed weapons.
 On September 11, 2008, Meleanie Hain had a handgun in plain view in a holster at her 5-year-old daughter's soccer game in Lebanon County, Pennsylvania, leading the county sheriff Michael DeLeo to revoke her weapons permit; Judge Robert Eby, a gun owner and concealed carry permit holder himself, later reinstated it. Hain launched a million-dollar lawsuit against Sheriff DeLeo, claiming he had infringed on her Second Amendment rights. About a year later, her estranged husband shot her dead in her home before killing himself. Police took several handguns, a shot gun, two rifles and several hundred rounds of ammunition from the Hains' home. Meleanie Hain's handgun was found fully loaded and in a backpack near the front door of the home, according to police. A second legal dispute with the sheriff continued after her death, but a federal judge dismissed that lawsuit on November 3, 2010.
 On April 20, 2009, Wisconsin Attorney General J.B. Van Hollen issued a memorandum to district attorneys stating that open carry was legal and in and of itself does not warrant a charge of disorderly conduct. Milwaukee police chief Ed Flynn instructed his officers to take down anyone with a firearm, take the gun away, and then determine if the individual could legally carry it until they could make sure the situation is safe.
 On May 31, 2009, Washington OpenCarry members held an open carry protest picnic at Silverdale's Waterfront Park, a county park. Attendees openly carried handguns in violation of posted regulations prohibiting firearms at the park. Washington state law allows the open carrying of firearms and specifically preempts local ordinances more restrictive than the state's, such as the one on the books for Kitsap county. Shortly after the protest Kitsap county commissioners voted to amend KCC10.12.080 to remove the language that banned firearms being carried in county parks. KCC10.12.080 Was amended on July 27, 2009 and as of May 31, 2012 most of the signs in the county still read that firearms are prohibited despite numerous attempts to get the county to update the signs. The amendment is listed as it reads in meeting minutes from July 2009: 
 In July 2009, an open carry event organized by OpenCarry.org took place at Pacific Beach, San Diego, California, where citizens carrying unloaded pistols and revolvers were subjected to Section 12031(e) inspections of their firearms on demand by police officers. The officers were obviously well-briefed on the details of the law, which allowed Californians to openly carry only unloaded guns and allows carry of loaded magazines and speedloaders.
 On August 11, 2009, William Kostric, a New Hampshire resident, Free State Project participant, and former member of We The People's Arizona Chapter, was seen carrying a loaded handgun openly in a holster while participating in a rally outside a town hall meeting hosted by President Barack Obama at Portsmouth High School in New Hampshire. Kostric never attempted to enter the school, but rather stood some distance away on the private property of a nearby church, where he had permission to be. He held up a sign that read "It's Time to Water the Tree of Liberty!".
 On August 16, 2009, "about a dozen" people were noted by police to be openly carrying firearms at a health care rally across the street from a Veterans of Foreign Wars Convention in the Phoenix Convention Center, where President Barack Obama was giving an address. While the Secret Service was "very much aware" of these individuals, Arizona law does not prohibit open carry. No crimes were committed by these protesters, and no arrests were made. In an interview with Fox News, commentator James Wesley Rawles characterized the Phoenix protesters as "merely exercising a pre-existing right". When he was asked about open carry, "but ... without a permit?" Rawles opined, "We have a permit – it is called the Second Amendment."
 In May 2010, Jesus C. Gonzalez was arrested and charged with homicide in a shooting which occurred while he was carrying a handgun. Gonzalez was involved in two prior arrests for disorderly conduct, based on his open carry practice. He filed a lawsuit claiming fourth and fourteenth amendment violations. His suit and appeal were both dismissed. Gonzalez was convicted on lesser charges, including reckless homicide.
 The Starbucks coffee chain has been the target of several boycotts arranged by gun control groups to protest Starbucks' policy of allowing concealed and open carry weapons in stores, if allowed by local laws. A counter buycott was proposed for Valentines Day of 2012 to show support from gun owners for Starbucks, with the use of two dollar bills to represent Second Amendment rights. On September 17, 2013 Howard Schultz, the CEO of Starbucks, published a letter asking customers to refrain from bringing guns into his stores.
 On February 5, 2017, two self admitted open carry political activists, James Craig Baker and Brandon Vreeland, walked into a Dearborn, Michigan police station in order to protest what they felt was unfair profiling from an earlier traffic stop which had resulted from a 911 call after Baker had been seen near local businesses armed and dressed in tactical gear. When Baker entered the police station he was carrying an assault rifle at the "low ready" position, meaning it could be raised and fired at a moment's notice, with a fully loaded and inserted magazine. Baker was also wearing tactical gear and a ski mask. Vreeland was not armed, but was wearing body armor and carrying a camera on a tripod. The police on duty in the station immediately sounded an alarm that there was a possible active shooter in the lobby and the two activist were approached from all sides by police with guns drawn. Baker was ordered to set down his rifle and get on the floor, which he did so after a few minor protests. Vreeland, however, angrily confronted the police, stating he was not armed and only had a camera. He refused to comply with officer instructions and was tackled after several warnings to which he replied "fuck you". The two men were arrested and initially charged with misdemeanor crimes, including brandishing a weapon and disturbing the peace. These charges were later upgraded to felonies in court, partially due to a post investigation which revealed e-mails and text messages between the two men in which they discussed deliberately provoking police, staging incidents to incite lethal force situations, as well as discussing how to elude capture should police attempt to arrest them. Vreeland was eventually convicted on one count of carrying a concealed weapon, one count of felony resisting and opposing an officer, and one count of disturbing the peace. Baker was convicted on a single count of carrying a concealed weapon. Vreeland received a prison sentence of nine months to five years, and began serving his sentence at the Charles Egeler Reception and Guidance Center in the fall of 2017. Baker received time in county jail and three years probation.
 On September 1, 2017 the state of Texas legalized the open carrying of blades longer than 5.5 inches in public.

 April 30, 2020 hundreds of protesters—many of them carrying guns—descended on the Michigan Capitol to oppose Gov. Gretchen Whitmer's extension of the state's stay-at-home order by another two weeks, to May 15. Protesters have demonstrated against stay-at-home orders at capitols in dozens of states, but the protests in Michigan were the starkest example yet of protesters actually entering a capitol while the legislature was in session and bringing weapons with them. Michigan is an open-carry state, however, and there are no rules barring people from bringing guns into the Capitol.

Diversity in state laws
, 45 states allowed open carry, but the details vary widely.

Four states, the Territory of the U.S. Virgin Islands and the District of Columbia fully prohibit the open carry of handguns. Twenty-five states permit open carry of a handgun without requiring the citizen to apply for any permit or license. Fifteen states require some form of permit (often the same permit as allows a person to carry concealed), and the remaining five states, though not prohibiting the practice in general, do not preempt local laws or law enforcement policies, and/or have significant restrictions on the practice, such as prohibiting it within the boundaries of an incorporated urban area. Illinois allows open carry on private property only.

On October 11, 2011, California Governor Jerry Brown signed into law that it would be a "misdemeanor to openly carry an exposed and unloaded handgun in public or in a vehicle." This does not apply to the open carry of rifles or long guns or persons in rural areas where permitted by local ordinance.

On November 1, 2011, Wisconsin explicitly acknowledged the legality of open carry by amending its disorderly conduct statute (Wis. Stat. 947.01). A new subsection 2 states "Unless other facts and circumstances that indicate a criminal or malicious intent on the part of the person apply, a person is not in violation of, and may not be charged with a violation of, this section for loading, carrying, or going armed with a firearm, without regard to whether the firearm is loaded or is concealed or openly carried."

On May 15, 2012, Oklahoma Governor Mary Fallin signed Senate Bill 1733, an amendment to the Oklahoma Self Defense Act, which will allow people with Oklahoma concealed weapons permits to open carry if they so choose. The law took effect November 1, 2012. "Under the measure, businesses may continue to prohibit firearms to be carried on their premises. SB 1733 prohibits carrying firearms on properties owned or leased by the city, state or federal government, at corrections facilities, in schools or college campuses, liquor stores and at sports arenas during sporting events."

Federal Gun Free School Zones Act
The Federal Gun-Free School Zones Act of 1990 limits where a person may legally carry a firearm by generally prohibiting carry within 1,000 ft of the property line of any K–12 school in the nation, with private property excluded.

In a 1995 Supreme Court case, the Act was declared unconstitutional (on Federalism, not Second Amendment grounds), but was reenacted in the slightly different form in 1996.

See also
 Concealed carry in the United States
 Gun ownership
 Gun politics
 Gun politics in the US
 Gun laws in the United States (by state)
 Gun-free zone

References

Licenses
Gun politics in the United States
Self-defense
United States firearms law